Element of Doubt is a 1996 British thriller television film directed by Christopher Morahan and starring Gina McKee and Nigel Havers.

Plot
A seemingly perfect couple begin to dispute when they should have children and their relationship rapidly deteriorates until she is afraid he might kill her.

Cast
 Nigel Havers - Richard
 Gina McKee - Beth  
 Judy Parfitt - Genevieve  
 Michael Jayston - Kirk 
 Polly Adams - Ellen 
 Mary Woodvine - Lucy  
 Robert Reynolds - Nat 
 Helen Anderson - Teacher 
 Christopher Baines - Peter 
 Sarah Berger - Mary Harper 
 Hilary Gish - Estate Agent 
 Denis Lill - Simon 
 Alex Linstead - Pharmacist 
 Patrick McGrady - Policeman

References

External links

1996 films
1996 thriller films
Films directed by Christopher Morahan
British thriller television films
1990s English-language films
1990s British films